Alex Kelly may refer to:

 Alex Kelly (rapist) (born 1967), American convicted rapist from Connecticut
 Alex Kelly (The O.C.), fictional character played by Olivia Wilde in the U.S. television series The O.C.
 Alex Kelly (rugby union) (c. 1871–c. 1913), Australian rugby union player
 Alex Kelly (filmmaker) (born c. 1979), Australian filmmaker

See also 

 Alexander Kelly (disambiguation)
 Alexandra Kelly, UK-based entrepreneur